Militant means vigorously active, combative and aggressive, especially in support of a cause.

Militant may also refer to:

 The Militant, an international socialist news magazine, published since 1928
 Militant (Trotskyist group), commonly called the Militant tendency, and its newspaper Militant, published since 1964
 Militant in Liverpool, the actions of the group in the 1980s
 The Militants, or Militant faction, an organized grouping in the Socialist Party of America during the 1930s
 Militant Group, a British Trotskyist group of the 1930s, and their journal Militant from 1937

See also
 
 Church Militant